Chucho el Roto is a 1960 Mexican historical adventure film directed by Manuel Muñoz and starring Carlos Baena, Adriana Roel and Óscar Pulido. It portrays the life of the nineteenth century bandit Chucho el Roto.

Cast
 Carlos Baena as Chucho el Roto  
 Adriana Roel 
 Óscar Pulido 
 Arturo Martinez 
 Miguel Arenas 
 Tito Novaro 
 Fanny Schiller
 Norma Angélica
 Carlos Ancira 
 Emma Roldán 
 Francisco Reiguera

References

Bibliography 
 Emilio García Riera. Historia documental del cine mexicano: 1959-1960. Universidad de Guadalajara, 1994.

External links 
 

1960 films
1960s action adventure films
Mexican action adventure films
1960s historical adventure films
Mexican historical adventure films
1960s Spanish-language films
Films set in the 19th century
1960s Mexican films